Gravel Hill is an unincorporated community in Sussex County, Delaware, United States. Gravel Hill is located at the intersection of U.S. Route 9/Delaware Route 404 and Delaware Route 30, east of Georgetown.

References

External links

Unincorporated communities in Sussex County, Delaware
Unincorporated communities in Delaware